German submarine U-49 was a Type VIIB U-boat of Nazi Germany's Kriegsmarine during World War II. She was ordered on 21 November 1936 and laid down on 15 September 1938 at the yards of Friedrich Krupp Germaniawerft AG in Kiel as yard number 584. Launched on 24 June 1939, she was commissioned  on 12 August and assigned to the 7th U-Boat Flotilla under the command of Kurt von Goßler.

Design
German Type VIIB submarines were preceded by the shorter Type VIIA submarines. U-49 had a displacement of  when at the surface and  while submerged. She had two shafts and two  propellers.

U-49 was fitted with five  torpedo tubes (four fitted at the bow and one at the stern), fourteen torpedoes, one  SK C/35 naval gun, 220 rounds, and one  C/30 anti-aircraft gun. The boat had a complement of between forty-four and sixty.

Service history

First patrol
Following training exercises, U-49 departed on her first active patrol on 9 November 1939. She was attacked by allied forces twice during this time.

At 09:35 on 19 November U-49 came into contact with the 4,258 GRT British merchant ship  carrying a cargo of 6,985 tons of maize. A bow torpedo at 11:15 hours and a stern shot at 11.24 both missed their mark, but a third fired at 12:19 hit, and the ship sank slowly by the stern at position .

Second patrol
U-49s second patrol began 29 February 1940 at Kiel and lasted only six days in the North Sea. No ships were attacked on this patrol, and she made port at Wilhelmshaven on 5 March 1940.

Third patrol
On 11 March 1940, U-49 departed Wilhelmshaven for the Norwegian coast, in 19 days at sea, no ships were attacked and the submarine returned to Wilhelmshaven on 29 March 1940.

Fourth patrol
3 April 1940 saw the beginning of U-49s fourth and final patrol. In 13 days off the Norwegian coast, no ships were attacked.

Fate
Of her crew of 42, one man died but there were 41 survivors.

Wreck Site
The wreck of U-49 was found on 3 March 1993 by the Norwegian submarine .

Summary of raiding history

References

Bibliography

External links

1939 ships
German Type VIIB submarines
Ships built in Kiel
U-boats commissioned in 1939
U-boats sunk by depth charges
U-boats sunk by British warships
U-boats sunk in 1940
World War II shipwrecks in the Norwegian Sea
World War II submarines of Germany
Maritime incidents in April 1940